Calum Brian Joseph Ward (born 17 October 2000) is an English professional footballer who plays as a goalkeeper for AC Oulu.

Career
Ward joined AFC Bournemouth in 2013. In March 2019, after loan spells at Wessex Football League sides Totton & Eling and Bashley, Ward joined Thatcham Town on loan. He made seven Southern Football League appearances for Thatcham Town.

In July 2019, he joined National League South side Weymouth on a season-long loan deal.

In January 2021, he joined Veikkausliiga side HIFK on loan until June. In April 2021, the move was made permanent.

On 17 November 2021, Ward joined fellow Veikkausliiga side AC Oulu for the 2022 season.

Career statistics

References

External links
 
 Calum Ward at playmakerstats.com

English footballers
Living people
English expatriate footballers
English expatriate sportspeople in Finland
Expatriate footballers in Finland
Veikkausliiga players
Association football goalkeepers
HIFK Fotboll players
Weymouth F.C. players
Sportspeople from Essex
2000 births
Totton & Eling F.C. players
AFC Bournemouth players
Bashley F.C. players
Thatcham Town F.C. players
AC Oulu players